Marilou Correa Diaz-Abaya (March 30, 1955 – October 8, 2012) was a Filipina multi-award winning film director. She was conferred the Order of National Artists of the Philippines for Film and Broadcast Arts in 2022, she was the founder and president of the Marilou Diaz-Abaya Film Institute and Arts Center, a film school based in Antipolo, Philippines. She was the director of the 1998 film José Rizal, a biographical film on the Philippines' national hero of the same name. She was part of the Second Golden Age of Philippine Cinema.

Early life
Diaz was born in Quezon City in 1955. She was one of seven children of lawyers Conrado Diaz and Felicitas Correa Diaz. She grew up quite privileged. Her father is from Paoay, Ilocos Norte, and is related to Valentín Díaz, who was one of the founding signatories in 1892 of the nationalist association La Liga Filipina with José Rizal, whom her famous film was about.

Marilou and her siblings grew up in a house filled with art that was instituted by their parents who were art collectors. On the walls of their house hung several painting by national artist Fernando Amorsolo. Diaz-Abaya and her siblings were forced by their parents to take up piano classes and ballet classes. According to Diaz-Abaya, later on, as she became a filmmaker, she realized the importance of art in her youth.

Growing up, Diaz-Abaya was not a film buff, and rather had more interest in literature and history.

An event that lead Diaz-Abaya to film was her applying for Communication Arts in the Assumption Convent. She intended to enroll for Asian Civilizations studies, but was not able to because the History Department was closed. Because of this she enrolled for Communication Arts and intended to stay for only one semester, but her love for theater acting free. During her time in college, she produced plays at the Cultural Center of the Philippines. Also in college, she was able to direct her first film.
She studied in several private schools (at St. Theresa's College from Kindergarten to High School), eventually graduating from Assumption College with a degree in Bachelor of Arts, major in Communication Arts in 1976. She went to Los Angeles for further studies and graduated from Loyola Marymount University with a degree in Master of Arts in Film and Television in 1978. She then went to London and completed the Film Course at London International Film School also in 1978.

Career
She entered the Philippine cinema industry in 1980 as a feminist director, yet she recalled growing up in a gender-free atmosphere. Diaz-Abaya's films are known for the struggles of the marginalized, and yet she never thought of a career in filmmaking while growing up in private Catholic schools for the elite.

Diaz-Abaya and her husband, after living in London, went back to the Philippines and got together with some theater friends to start an independent film company, Cine Filipinas, which was funded by their parents. Though Diaz-Abaya and her film company were able to produce films together, their films flopped at the box office and lost money. After this event, she met Jesse Ejercito, an independent film producer who recognized and enjoyed the cinematography and art direction of Diaz-Abaya's film Tanikala.

Diaz directed and released her first feature film, Tanikala (Chains) in 1980. Since then, she has been one of the most active and visible directors in Philippine cinema.

Jesse Ejercito gave Diaz-Abaya the opportunity to make a film and Diaz-Abaya proposed to have Ricky Lee, whom she has only heard of and not met, as a writer for her film. Ricky Lee would then be known as one of Diaz-Abaya's collaborators in film and credited as the screenplay writer for several of Diaz-Abaya's films. Lee and Diaz-Abaya's first collaboration was making Brutal, which premiered at the Metro Manila Film Festival in 1980. Brutal was a success and Ishmael Bernal, a highly regarded Filipino filmmaker, saw the film and wanted to meet Diaz-Abaya. Bernal became Diaz-Abaya's mentor. After her success with Brutal, she then directed Macho Gigolo.

Her early films Brutal, Karnal (Of the Flesh), and Alyas Baby Tsina, sharply condemn the oppressive social system during the administration of Philippine President Ferdinand Marcos. When the Marcos was deposed in 1986, Diaz left filmmaking.

Díaz produced television programs for several years. Her work attempts to reflect the social and political problems to attain social reform. She admittedly uses her work as a tool to uphold, promote, and protect the state of democracy in the Philippines.

Marilou Diaz-Abaya was the treasurer of the directors’ union under Lino Brocka for several years. In 1983, Diaz-Abaya joined the Concerned Artists of the Philippines, organized by Lino Brocka, and was an active member that opposed film censorship by the Marcos regime and joined in anti-government rallies.

In the early 1980s, Lily Monteverde, a prominent Filipino film producer for Regal productions, asked Diaz-Abaya to make Sensual (Of the Senses), a coming of age film that covered sexual topics. It premiered one day before the 1986 EDSA Revolution.

In 1995, she again directed films, beginning with the release of Ipaglaban Mo (Redeem Her Honor). She continued directing such films as May Nagmamahal sa Iyo (Madonna and Child), Sa Pusod ng Dagat (In the Navel of the Sea), José Rizal, and Muro-Ami (Reef Hunters). Her body of work is a continuous examination of difficult social problems in the country. Her works often deal with the lives of the Filipino poor, women, and children who struggle to survive under harsh conditions.

Arguably her most famous work, José Rizal, featured actor César Montano playing the national hero.

A Japanese award-giving body described her body of work to be "harmoniously blending entertainment, social consciousness, and ethnic awareness." The organization continued by saying: "(Her work) has won acclaim both in the Philippines and abroad for its high level of artistic achievement. It is an ideal manifestation of the artistic culture of Asia, and so is most deserving of the Arts and Culture Prize of the Fukuoka Asian Culture Prizes."

Personal life
She was married to cinematographer and educator Manolo Abaya, relative of Plaridel Abaya and they have two sons: singer/actor Marc Abaya and David Abaya, a cinematographer. Her nephew, Joseph Emilio "Jun" Abaya, who was Congressman of Cavite and became Secretary of Transportation and Communication.

She met Manolo when she was 15 years of age, and Manolo helped her turn to filmmaking. Marilou and Manolo got married in Manila and soon after, went to live in London as Marilou studied at the London International Film School. Manolo and Abaya would work together. Manolo would usually be credited as the director of photography and editor for most of Diaz-Abaya's work.

She referred the city of Fukuoka in Japan as her second home because of her films became well-regarded and recognized by critics and moviegoers.

Death
Diaz-Abaya was diagnosed with breast cancer, which caused her death on October 8, 2012. She was buried at Loyola Memorial Park in Parañaque.

Awards
Diaz is the 2001 Laureate of the Fukuoka Prize for Culture and the Arts in Japan. She has won numerous directing awards from award-giving bodies such as the Metro Manila Film Festival, the Urian Awards, the Film Academy of the Philippines, the Famas Awards, the Star Awards, the Catholic Mass Media Awards the British Film Institute Award, the International Federation of Film Critics Award (FIPRESCI), and the Network of Pan Asian Cinema Award (NETPAC).

On June 10, 2022, Malacanang Palace, upon joint recommendation of the National Commission for Culture and the Arts (NCCA) and the Cultural Center of the Philippines (CCP), officially announced Marilou Diaz-Abaya as National Artist for Film and Broadcast Art together with Nora Aunor and Ricky Lee, by virtue of Proclamation no. 1390.

Organizations
Diaz was an active film and television producer and director. She was a director of the Film Development Council of the Philippines, the president of the Marilou Diaz-Abaya Film Institute and Arts Center and Dive Solana Inc., a film instructor at the Ateneo de Manila University, a trustee of the Jesuit Communications Foundation and the AMANU Media Apostolate, and a member of the Silsilah Dialogue Movement for Peace, the Artists for Peace, the Mothers for Peace, and the World Association of Psycho-Socio Rehabilitation.

Filmography
Díaz directed at least 21 full-length feature films which include internationally exhibited films with English titles and subtitles. The partial list includes the following:
Tanikala (Chains; 1980)
Brutal (Brutal; 1980)
Moral (1982)
Karnal (Of the Flesh; 1983)
Baby Tsina (1984)
Sensual (Of the Senses; 1986)
Kung Ako'y Iiwan Mo (1992)
Ikalabing-Isang Utos (Mahalin Mo, Asawa Mo) (11th Commandment: Love Your Spouse; 1994)
Ipaglaban Mo, The Movie (Redeem Her Honor; 1995)
May Nagmamahal Sa'yo (Madonna and Child; 1996)
Milagros (1997)
Sa Pusod ng Dagat (In the Navel of the Sea; 1998)
José Rizal (1998)
Muro-Ami (Reef Hunters; 1999)
Bagong Buwan (New Moon; 2001)
Noon at Ngayon: Pagsasamang Kay Ganda (2003)
Maging Akin Muli (television film, 2005)
Ikaw ang Pag-ibig (2011)

Unfinished films:
1986: Four Days in February (about the People Power Revolution, in EDSA); shelved due to political reasons.
1990: Victory Boy (about the presence of US Bases in the Philippines; particularly the US Naval Base, in Olongapo); supposed to star then Senator Joseph Ejercito Estrada and Philippine superstar Nora Aunor; shelved due to political reasons; discontinued when the US Military Bases were removed in 1991.

Videography
Díaz has also directed television shows such as the following:
Public Forum (1986–1995), a public affairs talk show hosted by Randy David.
Sic O'Clock News (1987–1990), a news satire program.
Various documentaries including Silsilah Dialogue Movement for God's Peace.
Men of Light, a weekly talk show on the scriptures based in San Fernando, Pampanga, hosted by Fr. Pablo David, Fr. Raul de los Santos, and Fr. Deo Galang.

Awards

References

External links

Marilou Diaz-Abaya Film Institute and Arts Center
Star Cinema
The Marilou Diaz-Abaya Film Institute Experience

1955 births
2012 deaths
Ateneo de Manila University alumni
Filipino film directors
Filipino television personalities
Filipino television directors
Filipino educators
Filipino expatriates in the United Kingdom
Filipino women film directors
Ilocano people
Deaths from cancer in the Philippines
Deaths from breast cancer
People from Quezon City
Assumption College San Lorenzo alumni
Loyola Marymount University alumni
Women television directors